Billy Owens and the Secret of the Runes is a 2010 fantasy film, a sequel to The Mystical Adventures of Billy Owens. The low-budget film was produced as a mockbuster, capitalizing on the success of Harry Potter film series The film follows the adventures of Billy Owens and his friends Mandy and Devin, as they attempt to save the town of Spirit River from the curse of the Norse God Loki.

Plot
Billy, joined by his friends Mandy, Devin and Danny, continue their adventure from the previous movie in the series, The Mystical Adventures of Billy Owens. With the help of their magical professor, Mr. Thurgood, the children are still learning about their new powers. When the carnival comes to town, we learn that Professor Mould has used the children to trap the soul of Mr. Thurgood in a magical amulet. As the legend goes, inserting the amulet into the scepter will result in the unlocking of the magical powers of the scepter, and release the treasure of the god Loki.

Billy and his pals set out on a journey through dark caves and enchanted forests, as they attempt to solve the riddle of the ancient runes, and find the scepter. The whole time, being pursued by Professor Mould and his sidekick, Luke.

Cast
 Dalton Mugridge as Billy Owens
 Christopher Fazio as Devin
 Ciara O'Hanlon as Mandy
 Roddy Piper as Mr. Thurgood
 Jordan Goulet as Kurt
 Paul Germs as Professor Mould

Release & Critical Reception
The movie was released via DVD on May 11, 2010 by MTI Home Video and Artistview Entertainment.

The film received mainly negative reviews. Rotten Tomatoes gave it an aggregate score of 0% based on 15 user reviews. DVD Verdict said of the movie "It's a step up from the first entry" (referring to The Mystical Adventures of Billy Owens), but went on to say "It's worse than only 99 percent instead of 99.9 percent of all other films that get distributed". MatchFlick's Mike Thomas gave the movie 0 out of 5 stars, saying of the movie "(it's) an obvious Harry Potter rip-off".

References

External links
 
 
 

2010 films
Canadian fantasy films
2010 fantasy films
English-language Canadian films
2010s English-language films
2010s Canadian films